Agonopterix budashkini is a moth of the family Depressariidae. It is found in Ukraine.

References

Moths described in 1998
Agonopterix
Moths of Europe